Quelle-Kupferheide is a railway station located in Bielefeld, Germany. The station is on the Osnabrück–Brackwede railway. The train services are operated by NordWestBahn.

Train services

The following services currently call at Quelle-Kupferheide:

References 

Railway stations in North Rhine-Westphalia
Buildings and structures in Bielefeld
Railway stations in Germany opened in 2000